Akhethetep was an ancient Egyptian official of the Old Kingdom, perhaps dating to the end of the Fifth or the beginning of the Sixth Dynasty. He is mainly known from his mastaba that was found at Saqqara. Many decorated parts were brought to the Louvre. 

The mastaba of Akhethetep is inscribed with many religious titles, including priest of Heka, priest of Khnum, and priest of Horus. He was also sole friend and leader of the two thrones.

From the inscriptions in his tomb it is also possible to reconstruct his family. His wife is unknown, but he had at least three sons: Seankhuptah (I), Rekhuef (I) and Akhethetep (II). Rekhuef (I) is known from his own mastaba not far away from that of his father. Rekhuef (I) had a son, who was named Akhethetep (III), who is also known from his own mastaba. Akhethetep (III) had two sons: Rekhuef (II) and Pehernefer, both also known from own mastabas.

References

Bibliography 

People of the Fifth Dynasty of Egypt
People of the Sixth Dynasty of Egypt
Ancient Egyptian priests